The Law is the first and only album from the Paul Rodgers led group The Law.

History
The Law was formed when Paul Rodgers met Kenney Jones in a nightclub in London and decided to put a band together.
The two teamed up with different supporting musicians in order to give Rodgers freedom to pursue whatever music style he felt like. Unlike his previous projects, in which he wrote or co-wrote most of the material, Rodgers relied heavily on outside writers to write songs for the album (such as Phil Collen, Chris Rea and Bryan Adams); the only chart topper of the album, "Laying Down the Law", was written by Rodgers himself. The album features notable appearances by David Gilmour, Bryan Adams and Chris Rea. The song "Stone" was previously recorded by Rea for his album Shamrock Diaries, and Rea (as well as Gilmour) plays guitar on this version. The track "Miss You in a Heartbeat", written by Phil Collen, was later recorded by Collen's band Def Leppard as a B-side for their Adrenalize album.

Aside from the single, the album was received very poorly by the critics. Paul Henderson in Q Magazine called it "lightweight". Rodgers soon moved on from the band to his solo work.

Track listing
"For a Little Ride" (Mark Mangold, Benny Mardones) - 3:54
"Miss You in a Heartbeat" (Phil Collen) - 4:32
"Stone Cold" (Tamara Champlin) - 4:13
"Come Save Me (Julianne)" (Charlie Black, Cliff Downs, Austin Roberts) -  4:01
"Laying Down the Law" (Rodgers) - 4:22
"Nature of the Beast" (Bryan Adams, Jim Vallance) - 3:53
"Stone" (Chris Rea) - 5:12
"Anything for You" (Steve Diamond, Eric McCusker) - 3:57
"Best of My Love" (Jerry Lynn Williams) - 4:36
"Tough Love" (Rodgers) - 3:41
"Missing You Bad Girl (Rodgers) - 4:42
"That's When You Fall in Love" (Rodgers) - 3:47 (Bonus track on 2008 re-release)

Personnel

The Law
Paul Rodgers - lead vocals, guitars, piano
Kenney Jones - drums
Jim Barber - lead guitar

Additional Musicians
John Staehely: Guitar
Pino Palladino: Bass
David Gilmour: Guitar on "Stone"
Chris Rea: Guitar on "Stone"
Bryan Adams, Mike Hehir: Guitars
John Astley, Steve Pigott: Keyboards, Programming
Albhy Galuten: Synthesizer
George Hawkins: Bass
Tom Pool: Drums
Joe Lala: Percussion
The Memphis Horns: Horns

Production
Produced By Chris Kimsey, Ahmet Ertegün, Howard Albert, Ron Albert, Kenney Jones, Shane Keister & Paul Rodgers
Engineers: Christopher Marc Potter, Alex Sadkin
Programming: John Jones
Mixing: Ahmet Ertegün, Shane Keister, Christopher Marc Potter
Mastering: Bob Ludwig
Re-Mastering: Jimmy Starr

References

1991 debut albums
Albums produced by Chris Kimsey
Albums produced by Ahmet Ertegun
Atlantic Records albums